Chopaka is an unincorporated settlement near the US border on the west bank of the Similkameen River in the Southern Interior of British Columbia, Canada.  Largely comprising two Indian Reserves, 'Chopaka IR No. 7 and Chopaka IR No. 8, the location was formerly listed as a railway station on the Great Northern Railroad (now BNSF). There is a border crossing at Chopaka, open daily 9 AM to 5 PM.

The name "Chopaka" is that of a legendary hunter of the Okanagan people who was turned to stone as Chopaka Mountain by Coyote.

The Chopaka Indian Reserves are under the governance of the Lower Similkameen Indian Band, based in Keremeos.

See also
Chopaka Lake, Washington

References

External links

Unincorporated settlements in British Columbia
Populated places in the Similkameen
Syilx